Eden Roc is a census-designated place (CDP) in Hawaii County, Hawaii, United States, located in the District of Puna. The population was 942 at the 2010 census, up from 451 at the 2000 census.

Geography
Eden Roc is located on the eastern side of the island of Hawaii at  (19.494564, -155.105427). It is bordered to the east by Fern Acres, to the north by Mountain View, and to the west by Fern Forest.

Demographics

As of the census of 2010, there were 942 people in 394 households residing in the CDP. The racial makeup of the CDP was 46.18% White, 0.42% African American, 0.53% American Indian & Alaska Native, 4.46% Asian, 9.98% Native Hawaiian & Pacific Islander, 0.42% from other races, and 38.00% from two or more races. Hispanic or Latino of any race were 16.24% of the population.

There were 394 households, out of which 24.8% had children under the age of 18 living with them. The average household size was 2.39.

In the CDP the population was spread out, with 25.7% under the age of 18, 7.9% from 18 to 24, 12.6% from 25 to 34, 19.7% from 35 to 49, 29.5% from 50 to 64, and 4.6% who were 65 years of age or older.  For every 100 females, there were 134.9 males.  For every 100 females, there were 74.1 males.

The median income for a household in the CDP at 2000 was $15,658, and the median income for a family at 2000 was $38,229. In the 2000 census, males had a median income of $21,146 versus $19,464 for females. The per capita income for the CDP in 2000 was $9,902.  About 16.9% of families and 34.9% of the population were below the poverty line in the 2000 census, including 18.9% of those under age 18 and none of those age 65 or over.

References

External links
 Eden Roc Estates Association

Census-designated places in Hawaii County, Hawaii
Populated places on Hawaii (island)